Anastasiya Merkushyna (Ukrainian: Анастасія Олегівна Меркушина; born 14 January 1995) is a Ukrainian biathlete. She is World Championships medalist. She participated at 2018 Winter Olympics.

Career
Her first international successes were medals at Junior World and European championships. Merkushyna is a two-time bronze medalist in girls' individual at the 2013 and 2016 Junior Worlds, a two-time silver medalist in relay, a three-time Junior European champion, and a three-time European medalist. In 2012 she qualified for 2012 Winter Youth Olympics in Innsbruck, Austria, where she was 14th both in sprint and pursuit.

Before receiving a spot in the Ukrainian national team, she participated in IBU Cup competitions. Her first World Cup race was in Swedish Östersund in 2014–15 season, where she finished 51st in individual. There she also competed in sprint, finishing 87th. Then she missed two World Cup stages returning in Oberhof, Germany. Since the Ukrainian team lacked its leaders (both Sochi Olympic champions Vita Semerenko and Olena Pidhrushna missed that season), she was invited to the relay team. Merkushyna did her job well by shooting without additional shots. Nevertheless, her personal results weren't good enough to debut at the World Championships. Next season she spent in IBU Cup competitions.

On 11 December 2016, Anastasiya Had her first relay podium in Pokljuka, Slovenia. She earned her first World Cup points in sprint in Oberhof. Since then, she has been a member of the national team regularly. She participated at 2017 Worlds, where she showed great achievements for her debut: 10th in sprint, 8th in pursuit, and 14th in mass start. Merkushyna won silver in relay.

She qualified to represent Ukraine at the 2018 Winter Olympics. In Pyeongchang her best achievement was 46th place in pursuit and 11th in relay. In an interview, she was disappointed about her performance and even cried.

Personal life
Her mother, Iryna Merkushina, is a former Ukrainian biathlete and 2003 World Championships silver medalist in relay. Her father, Oleh, is a coach. Anastasiya's parents were her first trainers.

Merkushyna studies management and international business at Ternopil National Economic University.

Fellow biathlete Erik Lesser provided his Twitter account with around 150,000 followers as a channel for Merkushyna to transmit viewpoints in March 2022, allowing some 20,000 Russians to see conditions in Ukraine following the 2022 Russian invasion of Ukraine.

On 13 March 2022, Merkushyna joined the State Border Guard Service of Ukraine; she did so "to protect the Ukrainian flag."

Results

Olympics
0 medals

World Championships
4 medals (1 silver, 3 bronze)

*During Olympic seasons competitions are only held for those events not included in the Olympic program.
**The single mixed relay was added as an event in 2019.

World Cup

Relay podiums

Rankings

IBU Cup

Individual podiums

Relay podiums

References

External links

1995 births
Living people
Ukrainian female biathletes
Sportspeople from Sumy
Biathletes at the 2012 Winter Youth Olympics
Biathlon World Championships medalists
Olympic biathletes of Ukraine
Biathletes at the 2018 Winter Olympics
Biathletes at the 2022 Winter Olympics
Ukrainian border guards
Ukrainian female military personnel
Laureates of the Prize of the Cabinet of Ministers of Ukraine for special achievements of youth in the development of Ukraine
21st-century Ukrainian women